Ruthie Matthes (born November 11, 1965) is an American professional bicycle racer who won the World Cross-Country Mountain Bike Championship in 1991. She is also a road cyclist, having twice finished in 2nd place in the Women's Challenge bicycle stage race.  Ruthie is one of a series of professional riders who got their start in cycling through the Red Zinger Mini Classics youth bicycle race series in Colorado.

External links

1965 births
American female cyclists
Cross-country mountain bikers
Cyclists at the 2000 Summer Olympics
Olympic cyclists of the United States
Living people
People from Sun Valley, Idaho
UCI Mountain Bike World Champions (women)
American mountain bikers
21st-century American women